The 2017–18 Triobet Baltic Basketball League was the 14th and the last season of the Baltic Basketball League and the third under the title sponsorship of Triobet. The season began on 24 October 2017 and concluded on 5 April 2018. Last year's finalist Pieno žvaigždės defeated Jūrmala in the finals to win their first Baltic Basketball League title.

Competition format
In this edition 14 teams took part. They were divided into two groups of seven teams where, after a double-legged round-robin, the best four of each group will qualify to the quarterfinals. Kazakh team Barsy Atyrau and Belarusian Tsmoki-Minsk II played all their matches abroad.

Midway through the season Vytautas withdrew from the league due to them forfeiting two different games in this league for different reasons. As a result, they would participate in a series of friendly matches dubbed the Big Baller Brand Challenge Games; it was created for the purpose of promoting their newest acquisitions at the time in LiAngelo Ball and LaMelo Ball.

Team information

Regular season

Group A

Group B

Playoffs

In the knockout phase rounds will be played in a home-and-away format, with the overall cumulative score determining the winner of a round. Thus, the score of one single game can be tied.

Bracket

Finals

Game 1

Game 2

Awards

MVP of the Month
{| class="wikitable" style="text-align: center;"
! align="center" width=100|Month
! align="center" width=200|Player
! align="center" width=200|Team
! align="center" width=|Ref.
|-
|November 2017||align="left"| Steven Cook ||align="left"| University of Tartu || 
|-
|December 2017||align="left"| Laurynas Birutis ||align="left"| Šiauliai ||  
|-
|January 2018||align="left"| Janar Talts ||align="left"| University of Tartu || 
|-
|February 2018||align="left"| Ivars Žvīgurs ||align="left"| Jūrmala || 
|-
|March 2018||align="left"| Laurynas Birutis (2) ||align="left"| Šiauliai ||

Finals MVP
 Jahenns Manigat ( Pieno žvaigždės)

Player statistics
Players qualify to this category by having at least 50% games played.

Points

Assists

Rebounds

Efficiency

References

External links
 Official website

Baltic Basketball League seasons
2017–18 in European basketball leagues
2017–18 in Lithuanian basketball
2017–18 in Estonian basketball
2017–18 in Latvian basketball
2017–18 in Belarusian basketball
2017–18 in Kazakhstani basketball